Heinrich Gottlob Lang (1739,  Dresden - 1809, Augsberg ) was a German entomologist who specialised in Lepidoptera.
He was an artist illustrating books on natural history, naturalist and natural history collector, notably of minerals.
He wrote Verzeichniss seiner Schmetterlinge, in den Gegenden um Augsburg gesammelt und nach dem Wiener systematischen Verzeichniss eingetheilt : mit den Linneischen, auch deutschen und französischen Namen, und Anführung derjenigen Werke, worinn sie mit Farben abgebildet sind Zweyte, verbesserte und stark vermehrte Auflage. - pp. I-XXVIII [= 1-28], 1–226, [1]. Augsburg. (Klett).pdf
published by Maria Jakobina Klett (1709-1795) in which he describes Melitaea diamina. Maria Jakobina Klett was owner of Eberhard Klett Verlag, one of the most important Augsburg “Protestant publishers.” She published many technical books

He was also a heraldic, and seal-engraver

References 
 Gaedike, R.; Groll, E. K. & Taeger, A. 2012: Bibliography of the entomological literature from the beginning until 1863 : online database – version 1.0 – Senckenberg Deutsches Entomologisches Institut.
Groll, E. K. 2017: Biographies of the Entomologists of the World. – Online database, version 8, Senckenberg Deutsches Entomologisches Institut, Müncheberg – URL: sdei.senckenberg.de/biografies
Seidler, F. 2006: Heinrich Gottlob Lang (1739-1809) - Ein Augsburger Künstler, Naturforscher und Naturaliensammler. Berichte des Naturwissenschaftlichen Vereins für Schwaben e. V., Augsburg 110, S. 22-31

External links
Zobodat

German lepidopterists
1809 deaths
1739 births